KXRN-LP (branded as "KX FM) is a low-power FM (LPFM) non-commercial radio station broadcasting at 104.7 MHz FM, and airing generational rock and community programming to Laguna Beach, California. The station serves a 5-square-mile area. It is a 501(c)(3) non-profit corporation, founded in 2012 by Tyler Russell. As of 2014, the station operated on an annual budget of approximately $300,000.

KXRN-LP changed its community of license from Laguna Niguel to Laguna Beach, and its frequency from 93.5 to 104.7 on February 3, 2020, so that they could increase their height and have less interference from KDEY-FM and KDAY both on 93.5 with KDEY-FM being to the North and KDAY-FM being to the Northwest. They have also started broadcasting in HD Radio. The station was licensed for its new facilities on April 3, 2020.

References

External links
 https://www.kxfmradio.org/
 

XRN-LP
XRN-LP
Community radio stations in the United States